The South Trunk Road is a major arterial road on the island of Trinidad, in Trinidad and Tobago. It runs for 13.7 km (8.5 mi).

It connects the San Fernando Bypass at the Cipero Street interchange to the Sir Solomon Hochoy Highway at Mon Desir, bisecting the communities along the southern outskirts of San Fernando. 

Much of the road's route was initially signed as the Southern Main Road, but the entire route was eventually widened to a four-lane dual carriageway and eventually extended south to meet the extended Sir Solomon Hochoy Highway.

Description

Route 
The road runs generally north-south. At its northern end, it joins the San Fernando Bypass heading north to Marabella. It connects to the Golconda Connector Road, S.S. Erin Road and Cipero Street at its northern end via an interchange. The road runs south past commercial areas before meeting the Gulf View Link Road and the Gulf City Mall. It then runs towards Dumfries Road, dividing the Gulf City Mall compound and Gulf View with the commercial and industrial areas on the southern side. It meets Dumfries Road and runs towards Bel Air and La Bel Air, meeting Alice Street at a traffic light, and then meeting PriceSmart/Lucky Street. The Potato Trace light provides access to industrial areas on the northern side. At Paria Suites, the Southern Main Road joins and the road runs alongside the South Oropouche Swamp, on the edge of the mangrove alongside the coastline. This section of roadway has been raised to prevent flooding, but is currently a two-lane road as the outer carriageway remains incomplete. The road bridges over the Godineau River at Mosquito Creek, past the Shore of Peace cremation site. At the St. Mary's interchange, presently under construction, the Southern Main Road runs westward into Rousillac, and the South Trunk Road runs south eventually meeting the Sir Solomon Hochoy Highway at Mon Desir.

Features 
For its entire route excluding Mosquito Creek and a short section at St. Mary's, the road is a four-lane at grade dual carriageway. The speed limit on most of the route is 80 km/h.

References 

Roads in Trinidad and Tobago